Quiet is a solo EP released by Jim Ward. It is the first time Ward has released an album of solo material, although he has previously released two solo songs on compilation discs. It was released November 6, 2007 by Ward's own Civil Defense League record label. The album was marketed and distributed by Doghouse Records.

Track listing

Personnel
Jim Ward - Guitar, vocals
Ray Wallace - Harmonica and Back-up vocals on "On My Way Back Home"
Maura Davis - Harmony on "Take It Back"
Christ Heinrich - Ukulele on "Coastlines"

References 

2007 EPs